Bradley William Fewster (born 27 January 1996) is an English semi-professional footballer who plays as a striker for Whitby Town.

Fewster started his career with Middlesbrough, and had loan spells with Preston North End, York City and Hartlepool United. He was released by Middlesbrough in 2017 and spent a season with Spennymoor Town before joining Blyth Spartans. He has represented England from under-16 through to under-19 level.

Club career

Middlesbrough
Born in Middlesbrough, North Yorkshire, Fewster joined the Middlesbrough academy before signing a three-year professional contract in July 2013. Fewster made his first-team debut on 12 August 2014 in a League Cup win over Oldham Athletic, starting the game. Fewster scored his first goal against Preston North End on 27 August 2014 on his second senior outing for the club.

Fewster joined League One club Preston North End on 27 November 2014 on a season-long youth loan. However, the loan was cut short for "personal reasons" after only two weeks. Fewster signed for League Two club York City on 26 November 2015 on a one-month youth loan and scored on his debut against Accrington Stanley.

On 30 August 2016, Fewster joined League Two club Hartlepool United on loan until 31 December. He was released by Middlesbrough at the end of the 2016–17 season.

Spennymoor Town and Blyth Spartans
Fewster signed for National League North club Spennymoor Town on 31 August 2017. He signed for another National League North club, Blyth Spartans, on 11 July 2018.

Whitby Town
On 28 February 2019, Fewster joined Whitby Town on a contract until the end of next season. Fewster's first season with Whitby was ended prematurely due to the COVID-19 outbreak, he scored nine times in 10 league appearances in his debut season with the club.

International career
Fewster has represented England at under-16, under-17, under-18 and under-19 levels.

On 18 February 2014, Fewster scored a hat-trick for England under-18s against Belgium U18. He scored on his under-19 debut against Germany in a 1–1 draw, before scoring four goals in three matches in the first round of 2015 UEFA European Under-19 Championship qualification.

Career statistics

Honours
Individual
Football League Two Player of the Month: February 2016

References

External links

1996 births
Living people
Footballers from Middlesbrough
English footballers
England youth international footballers
Association football forwards
Middlesbrough F.C. players
Preston North End F.C. players
York City F.C. players
Hartlepool United F.C. players
Spennymoor Town F.C. players
Blyth Spartans A.F.C. players
Whitby Town F.C. players
English Football League players
National League (English football) players